In mathematics, mirror descent is an iterative optimization algorithm for finding a local minimum of a differentiable function.

It generalizes algorithms such as gradient descent and multiplicative weights.

History 

Mirror descent was originally proposed by Nemirovski and Yudin in 1983.

Motivation 

This can be reformulated by noting that

This Euclidean distance term is a particular example of a Bregman distance. Using other Bregman distances will yield other algorithms such as Hedge which may be more suited to optimization over particular geometries.

Formulation 

We are also given differentiable convex function , -strongly convex with respect to the given norm. This is called the distance-generating function, and its gradient  is known as the mirror map.

Starting from initial , in each iteration of Mirror Descent:

 Map to the dual space: 
 Update in the dual space using a gradient step: 
 Map back to the primal space: 
 Project back to the feasible region : , where  is the Bregman divergence.

Extensions 

Mirror descent in the online optimization setting is known as Online Mirror Descent (OMD).

See also 
 Gradient descent
 Multiplicative weight update method
 Hedge algorithm
 Bregman divergence

References 

Mathematical optimization
Optimization algorithms and methods
Gradient methods